Tod Ohnstad (born May 21, 1952) is an American politician, retired machinist, and former union representative.  A Democrat, he is a current member of the Wisconsin State Assembly, representing the Kenosha-based 65th assembly district since 2013.

Biography

Ohnstad was born in Eau Claire, Wisconsin and graduated from Altoona High School in 1970.  He moved to Kenosha and attended University of Wisconsin–Parkside.  He worked at Kenosha Engine, first when it was operated by American Motors Corporation, then later for General Motors, and Chrysler.  During his work in the auto industry, he was heavily involved with the UAW Local 72 labor union. He was a member of the Executive Board of the United Auto Workers from 1984 to 2004.

Ohnstad served on the Kenosha Common Council from 2008 until 2014. In August 2012, Ohnstad won the 65th District Democratic primary for Wisconsin State Assembly and did not face an opponent in the November general election. He did not face an opponent in the general election until 2020, when he defeated Republican nominee Crystal Miller.

Electoral history

| colspan="6" style="text-align:center;background-color: #e9e9e9;"| Primary Election

| colspan="6" style="text-align:center;background-color: #e9e9e9;"| General Election

| colspan="6" style="text-align:center;background-color: #e9e9e9;"| Primary Election

| colspan="6" style="text-align:center;background-color: #e9e9e9;"| General Election

| colspan="6" style="text-align:center;background-color: #e9e9e9;"| Primary Election

| colspan="6" style="text-align:center;background-color: #e9e9e9;"| General Election

| colspan="6" style="text-align:center;background-color: #e9e9e9;"| Primary Election

| colspan="6" style="text-align:center;background-color: #e9e9e9;"| General Election

References

External links
 
 
 Official website

Living people
Politicians from Eau Claire, Wisconsin
Politicians from Kenosha, Wisconsin
Wisconsin city council members
Democratic Party members of the Wisconsin State Assembly
University of Wisconsin–Parkside alumni
1952 births
21st-century American politicians